Gen V (also known as The Boys: Gen V) is an upcoming American superhero streaming television series, developed by Michele Fazekas and Tara Butters, serving as a spin-off of The Boys by Eric Kripke, and based on The Boys comic book story arc "We Gotta Go Now" by Garth Ennis and Darick Robertson. The series, set concurrently with the fourth season of The Boys, is expected to premiere on Amazon Prime Video in 2023.

Plot
Young adult Supes (superheroes) are tested in battle royal challenges at the Godolkin University School of Crimefighting, run by Vought International.

Cast

Main
 Jaz Sinclair as Marie Moreau
 Lizze Broadway as Emma Shaw
 Chance Perdomo as Andre
 Maddie Phillips as Cate
 Derek Luh and London Thor as Jordan
 Asa Germann
 Shelley Conn

Recurring
 Patrick Schwarzenegger as Golden Boy
 Sean Patrick Thomas as Polarity
 Marco Pigossi as Doctor Edison Cardosa
 Jason Ritter
 Alexander Calvert
 Clancy Brown

Guest
 Jessie T. Usher as Reggie Franklin / A-Train
 Colby Minifie as Ashley Barrett
 P. J. Byrne as Adam Bourke

Production

Development
On September 20, 2020, a spin-off of The Boys was announced, with Craig Rosenberg writing and executive producing the series with Eric Kripke, Seth Rogen, Evan Goldberg, James Weaver, Neal H. Moritz, Pavun Shetty, Michaela Starr, Garth Ennis, Darick Robertson, Sarah Carbiener, Erica Rosbe, Aisha Porter-Christie, Judalina Neira, and Zak Schwartz. On September 27, 2021, Amazon gave the order for the series and Michele Fazekas and Tara Butters were set as showrunners and executive producers of the series. On October 2, 2020, Kripke stated the Hunger Games-inspired series would focus on the G-Men team mentioned in the first season of The Boys, originally created as a parody of Marvel Comics' X-Men for the fourth volume of Ennis' and Robertson's comic book series: "We Gotta Go Now", from which the series is "loosely inspired".

On January 5, 2023, it was announced that a writing room for a potential second season will soon come together, which will be led by Michele Fazekas who also has become sole showrunner after Tara Butters has taken a break from work.

Casting
On March 11, 2021, Lizze Broadway and Jaz Sinclair were cast in the series. On March 19, Shane Paul McGhie, Aimee Carrero, and Maddie Phillips were cast in the series. On April 15, 2021, Reina Hardesty was cast in the series. On March 10, 2022, Carrero and McGhie exited the series. A few days later, Chance Perdomo joined the main cast in a recasting, replacing McGhie. On April 25, 2022, Hardesty left the series. On May 9, 2022, London Thor was cast to replace Hardesty. Derek Luh, Asa Germann, and Shelley Conn also joined the cast as series regulars. Two days later, Patrick Schwarzenegger, Sean Patrick Thomas, and Marco Pigossi were cast in recurring capacities. In November 2022, Clancy Brown joined the cast in an undisclosed role. In December 2022, Jessie T. Usher, Colby Minifie, and P. J. Byrne were confirmed to be reprising their roles from The Boys, in guest appearances, as Reggie Franklin / A-Train, Ashley Barrett, and Adam Bourke, respectively.

Filming
Filming began at the University of Toronto Mississauga campus in May 2022 and the Claireville Conservation Area, Brampton in July, intended for an October wrap, under the working title of The Boys Presents: Varsity. In July 2022, it was announced that the series would officially be titled Gen V. In September 2022, members of the cast announced on social media that production had wrapped.

References

External links
 

The Boys (franchise)
2020s American college television series
2020s American comic science fiction television series
2020s American superhero comedy television series
2020s American black comedy television series
2020s American teen drama television series
Amazon Prime Video original programming
American television spin-offs
Dynamite Entertainment adaptations
English-language television shows
Television shows based on DC Comics
Television shows filmed in Toronto
Television series about teenagers
Television series by Amazon Studios
Television series by Sony Pictures Television
Upcoming drama television series
Upcoming comedy television series